Schinia ferrisi is a moth of the family Noctuidae. It is found south-eastern Arizona and south-western New Mexico.

Adults are on wing in September.

External links
Revision of the tertia species complex

Schinia
Moths of North America
Moths described in 2004